The Yokosuka E5Y (long designation: Yokosuka Navy Type 90-3 Reconnaissance Seaplane) was a single-engine Japanese seaplane used for reconnaissance. The E5Y was also built by Kawanishi as the E5K (long designation: Kawanishi Navy Type 90-3 Reconnaissance Seaplane)

Development
The Yokosuka Type 90-3 (E5Y1) was a second-generation seaplane with a  engine based on an updated Yokosuka E1Y, developed at the Yokosuka Naval Arsenal in Kanagawa Prefecture, featuring two externally mounted floats. The Japanese Navy initially designated it as the Yokosuka Navy Type 14-2 Kai-1 Reconnaissance Seaplane, but production was undertaken by Kawanishi as the Kawanishi Navy Type 90-3 Reconnaissance Seaplane.
 By 1932, the Aichi AB-6 was under development to replace the E5Y / E5K seaplanes.

Kawanishi E5K

The Kawanishi E5K1 or Kawanishi Type G was a large 1930s Japanese three-seat reconnaissance floatplane. The E5K1, a radial-engined twin-float seaplane, first flew in October 1931, but due to problems in development only 20 production aircraft were built. The type entered service with the Imperial Japanese Navy Air Service in April 1932 as the Kawanishi Navy Type 90-3 Reconnaissance Seaplane.

The E5K1 was a production version with a  Bristol Jupiter radial engine; 20 production aircraft were built.

Two pre-production Type-14-2 Kai-1-Ds, powered by the Bristol Jupiter were built by Kawanishi under the company name Kawanishi Type G. Seventeen production aircraft were built as the Kawanishi Navy Type 90-3 Reconnaissance Seaplane (E5K1).

Operational history
On 25 May 1932 the IJN seaplane tender-oiler Notoro was re-equipped with Kawanishi Navy Type 90-3 Reconnaissance Seaplanes as well as other tenders and battleships of the IJN. The E5K saw action during the Shanghai Incident from 28 January – 3 March 1932.
The Japanese seaplane tender Kamoi carried a complement of 12 E5Y aircraft.

Variants
Yokosuka Navy Type 14-2 Reconnaissance Seaplane Kai-1
Prototype of the later Type-14-2 and Type 90-3 production aircraft,  powered by a  Bristol Jupiter VIII radial engine.
Yokosuka Navy Type 14-2 Reconnaissance Seaplane Kai-1-C
Initial production aircraft powered by  Lorraine 12E Courlis W-12 water-cooled engines.
Yokosuka Navy Type 14-2 Reconnaissance Seaplane Kai-1-D
Later prototype aircraft with Jupiter engines in a lengthened nose.
Yokosuka Type 90-3 Reconnaissance Seaplane
Designation of production aircraft to have been built by the Yokosuka Naval Arsenal (Yokosho)
Kawanishi Type G
Company designation for two pre-production Navy Type 14-2 Reconnaissance Seaplane Kai-1-Ds.
Kawanishi Type 90-3 Reconnaissance Seaplane
Seventeen production aircraft, initially powered by Jupiter engines, with some later being re-engined with Hiro Type 91 520 hp water-cooled W-12 engines
Yokosuka E5Y1
Short designation of aircraft built at the Yokosuka Naval Arsenal, (a.k.a. Yokosho E5Y1)
Kawanishi E5K1
Short designation for the production aircraft built by Kawanishi

Specifications (Type 90-3 / E5Y1 / E5K1)

See also

References

Further reading

External links

world air forces website

Floatplanes
World War II Japanese patrol aircraft
E05Y
E05K
Biplanes
1930s Japanese military reconnaissance aircraft
Single-engined tractor aircraft